Sterrhostoma is a genus of moth in the family Gelechiidae. It contains the species Sterrhostoma heterogastra, which is found in Indonesia (Java).

The larvae feed on the leaves of Limonia acidissima.

References

Gelechiinae